V448 Carinae is a single star in the constellation Carina. It has the Bayer designation O Carinae, while V448 Carinae is the variable star designation. This object has an orange hue and is dimly visible to the naked eye with an apparent visual magnitude that fluctuates around 5.60. It is located at a distance of approximately 680 light years from the Sun based on parallax, and is drifting further away with a radial velocity of around +26 km/s.

This is an aging giant star with a stellar classification of K5III. Having exhausted the supply of hydrogen at its core, it has cooled and expanded off the main sequence and now has 51 times the girth of the Sun. It is classified as a probable semiregular variable star with a sub-type of SRd and a brightness that varies from visual magnitude 5.66 down to 5.86 over a period of 56.5 days. The star is an estimated 2.85 billion years old with 1.73 times the mass of the Sun. It is radiating 582 times the luminosity of the Sun from its swollen photosphere at an effective temperature of 3,974 K.

References

K-type giants
Semiregular variable stars
Carina (constellation)
Carinae, O
Durchmusterung objects
049877
049877
2526
Carinae, V448